The Seventh-day Adventist Commentary Reference Series is a set of volumes produced primarily by Seventh-day Adventist scholars, and designed for both scholarly and popular level use. It includes the seven-volume Seventh-day Adventist Bible Commentary, the two-volume Seventh-day Adventist Encyclopedia, as well as the single volumes Seventh-day Adventist Bible Dictionary, Seventh-day Adventist Bible Students' Source Book and Handbook of Seventh-day Adventist Theology. The series is published by the church-owned Review and Herald Publishing Association.

The project began with the Bible Commentary, which was first published from 1953 to 1957. Francis D. Nichol served as the editor-in-chief, and oversaw 37 contributors which included associate editors Raymond Cottrell and Don Neufeld, and assistant editor Julia Neuffer. It was revised in 1980. The seventh (last) volume also contains various indexes. The Bible Dictionary was published in 1960 and revised in 1979. The Bible Students' Source Book was published in 1962. The Encyclopedia was published in 1966, with a "Revised Edition" in 1976 and a "Second Revised Edition" in 1996. The Handbook was published in 2000.

It was the first systematic expository of the entire Bible made by the Adventist church, the first such to be consistently based on the original languages of the Bible, and the first to consistently incorporate cutting edge archaeological research to provide a historical context for interpretation.

Volumes 
The volumes include commentary (1–9) and other materials:
 Genesis to Deuteronomy
 Joshua to 2 Kings
 1 Chronicles to Song of Solomon
 Isaiah to Malachi
 Matthew to John
 Acts to Ephesians
 Philippians to Revelation
 Bible Dictionary
 Bible Students' Source Book
 Encyclopedia: A–L
 Encyclopedia: M–Z
 Handbook of Seventh-day Adventist Theology

Point of view 
In his instructions to the contributors, Nichol explained the commentary was not "to crystallize once and for all a dogmatic interpretation".  Where there were several notable interpretations, each major view was presented in a fair manner, but a consensus opinion of the editors was also given.  It did not attempt to finalize doctrinal positions nor take stands on debatable points, but to assist readers in making their own conclusions.  Cottrell said,

Nichol also required that no statement in the commentary should contradict the writings of Ellen White.  However the editors discovered that White sometimes interprets Scripture differently from what the original context implies, and this was for a homiletical (preaching, and/or to convince or persuade) rather than exegetical (strict interpretation) use.

History 
The idea for the commentary originated with J. D. Snider, book department manager of the Review and Herald Publishing Association, in response to a demand for an Adventist commentary like the classical commentaries of Jamieson-Fausset-Brown, Albert Barnes, or Adam Clarke.  Snider and the Review and Herald board nominated Francis D. Nichol, who was editor-in-chief of the church's flagship publication, the Review and Herald (now the Adventist Review). After consulting with lecturers at the Seventh-day Adventist Theological Seminary and others, Nichol assembled a team of individuals to work on the commentary.

Nichol stated that the Commentary would not have been possible without the theologically open climate in the church during the 1950s and 60s.

Contributors 
The full-time members of the team included editor-in-chief Francis Nichol, associate editors Don F. Neufeld and Raymond F. Cottrell, and assistant editor Julia Neuffer.  In addition there were six part-time editors – Leona Running and Earle Hilgert, who were teachers at the Seminary; and Alger Johns, Herbert Douglass, Bernard Seton and James Cox, who were graduate students recommended by the Seminary.  Although not officially a member of the commentary team, leading archaeologist Siegfried Horn provided his expertise at all stages of the project, and also contributed the most manuscript pages of any author.

According to Cottrell,

Most of the contributors were Bible scholars who taught at Adventist colleges.

The full list of authors was included in each volume of the commentary, however it was not specified which authors wrote which articles. Nichol decided on this approach for the privacy of the contributors, and also because substantial editing was often required in order to produce a consistent style, so that the responsibility of the content ultimately rested on the editors. Cottrell later published a full list of articles and corresponding contributors, when he felt that such protection was unnecessary.

Nichol estimated that the editorial process alone consisted of more than 77,000 hours of work.

See also 

 Seventh-day Adventist Church
 History of the Seventh-day Adventist Church
 28 fundamental beliefs
 Questions on Doctrine
 Biblical Research Institute
 Ellen G. White
 Teachings of Ellen White#End times
 Inspiration of Ellen White
 Ellen G. White bibliography
 List of Ellen White writings
 Conflict of the Ages (book series)
 Ellen G. White Estate
 Prophecy in the Seventh-day Adventist Church
 Seventh-day Adventist eschatology
 Francis D. Nichol
 Raymond Cottrell
 1952 Bible Conference
 Seventh-day Adventist theology

References 

See also the Preface for most of the volumes in the series, which contains some historical background, particularly of the Encyclopedia.

Bibliography
 .

External links 
 , PDF version (large file).
 .
 .

Books about Christianity
Commentary Reference Series
Commentary Reference Series